Star Fox is a video game series by Nintendo.

Star Fox may also refer to:

Video games

Star Fox series
Star Fox (1993 video game), also known as Starwing in Europe and Australia, the first game in the series released on the Super Nintendo Entertainment System
Star Fox team, the game series' titular fictional mercenary team
Fox McCloud, the main character of the series, sometimes colloquially referred to as "Star Fox"

Other games
Star Fox (1983 video game), a 1983 video game for the Atari 2600
Starfox (1987 video game), a home computer game by Reaktor Software

Other uses
Starfox (comics), a Marvel Comics superhero
The Star Fox, a 1965 science fiction novel by author Poul Anderson
Xingxing Fox (translated as Star Fox), a Chinese children's animated television show

See also
 Star (disambiguation)
 Fox (disambiguation)